Paul Malloy may refer to:

 Paul V. Malloy (fl. 2010s–2020s), Wisconsin judge
 Paul F. Malloy (born 1940), American attorney and politician in the Massachusetts House of Representatives

See also
Paul Maloy (1892–1976), American baseball player